Ahmad Esmaeilpour (born 8 September 1988) is an Iranian professional futsal player. He is a Right Winger, and currently a member of Shenzhen Nanling Tielang in the Chinese Futsal League and the Iran national futsal team.

Esmaeilpour was part of the Iranian team for the 2016 FIFA Futsal World Cup who finished third place after defeating Portugal in penalties. Esmaeilpour scored four goals throughout the tournament and won the Bronze Ball which is given to the third best player of the tournament.

Awards and honours

Country 
 FIFA Futsal World Cup
 Third place (1): 2016
 AFC Futsal Championship
 Champion (1): 2018
 Runners-up (1): 2014
 Third place (1): 2012
 Asian Indoor Games
 Champion (2): 2009 - 2017
 WAFF Futsal Championship
 Champion (1): 2012
 Grand Prix
 Runner-Up (1): 2015

Club 
 AFC Futsal Club Championship
 Champions (2): 2010 (Foolad Mahan) - 2012 (Giti Pasand)
 Runner-Up (3): 2011 (Shahid Mansouri) - 2013 (Giti Pasand) - 2017 (Giti Pasand)
 Iranian Futsal Super League
 Champions (5): 2009–10 (Foolad Mahan) - 2010–11 (Shahid Mansouri) - 2011–12 (Shahid Mansouri) - 2012–13 (Giti Pasand) - 2016–17 (Giti Pasand)
 Runners-up (2): 2013–14 (Giti Pasand) - 2014–15 (Giti Pasand)

Individual 
 Top Goalscorer:
 AFC Futsal Club Championship: 2012 (Giti Pasand) (9 goals)
 Iranian Futsal Super League: 2011–12 (Shahid Mansouri) (32 goals) - 2012–13 (Giti Pasand) (28 goals)
 Chinese Futsal League: 2018–19 (Qingdao Impulse Chenxi) (64 goals)
 Best Player:
 Best Winger: 2013–14 Iranian Futsal Super League (Giti Pasand)
 Bronze Ball:
2016 FIFA Futsal World Cup

International goals

References

External links 
 Official website
 
 

1988 births
Living people
People from Saveh
Iranian men's futsal players
Futsal forwards
Shahrdari Saveh FSC players
Foolad Mahan FSC players
Shahid Mansouri FSC players
Giti Pasand FSC players
Iranian expatriate futsal players
Iranian expatriate sportspeople in China